Mike Freeman is a columnist for Bleacher Report. He has previously written for The New York Times, Washington Post, Dallas Morning News, Boston Globe, Florida Times-Union and CBSSports.com. He is also the author of five books, including a biography on Florida State football coach Bobby Bowden. His book ESPN: The Uncensored History, which alleged sexual harassment, drug use and gambling, was the first critical study of ESPN.

In January 2004, Freeman resigned before starting a columnist job at The Indianapolis Star after he was discovered lying about his education, specifically falsely claiming a college degree. Tom Jolly, sports editor at The New York Times, said "Mike's career here speaks for itself, he did some great work here". Freeman subsequently said "There are no excuses and I have never made any. Never will either. I’ll get my degree this summer or fall and start my pursuit of an advanced degree the following spring."

Freeman's columns have included accusations of racism and sexism against his colleagues in the New York press. His columns are often seen as far-left and anti-religious. He was unsuccessfully sued for libel by golfer John Daly, with a circuit judge ruling that "Freeman's statements were either true or constitutionally protected opinion". In 2002 Freeman called for a tougher program from the National Football League for monitoring off-the-field violence and drug use.

References

External links
Biography, CBS Sports
Biography, Harper Collins Publisher

Living people
American sportswriters
The Indianapolis Star people
Year of birth missing (living people)